Laura Carolina González Rodríguez (born 10 June 1999) is a Colombian Paralympic swimmer who competes in the S8 and SM8 category events. She is a three-time Parapan American Games medalist and a Paralympic medalist.

Early life
González was born on 10 June 1999 in Villavicencio, Meta, the daughter of Eduardo González Valverde. She has a brother named Eduardo González Rodríguez. She began swimming at six years of age.

Career
González won three gold medals for swimming when she competed in the national competitions in Bogotá in 2019. She competed in the 2019 Parapan American Games, winning gold, silver and bronze in the 200m individual medley, 100m butterfly and 100m freestyle respectively.

González represented Colombia at the 2020 Summer Paralympics in the women's 200 metre individual medley and women's 100 metre butterfly S8 events and won a bronze medal in the latter. As a result, she is the first Colombian woman to win a Paralympic medal in swimming.

References

1999 births
Living people
People from Villavicencio
Colombian female swimmers
Paralympic swimmers of Colombia
Swimmers at the 2020 Summer Paralympics
Medalists at the 2020 Summer Paralympics
Paralympic medalists in swimming
Paralympic bronze medalists for Colombia
Medalists at the 2019 Parapan American Games
Medalists at the World Para Swimming Championships
S8-classified Paralympic swimmers
21st-century Colombian women